Tomas Fernandez Gonzalez (born 30 November 1989) is a Swedish footballer who plays as a midfielder. He is currently a free agent.

Career
IK Sätra were Fernandez's first youth team, he left them in 2001 to sign for Gefle IF. Eight years later, Fernandez was moved into their first-team squad during the 2009 Allsvenskan campaign, with manager Pelle Olsson selecting him for his professional debut during a home defeat to IFK Göteborg. In 2010, Fernandez signed for Brynäs IF of Division 3. Five goals in nineteen appearances followed over two seasons with the club. He joined Division 5 team Fellingsbro GoIF on 24 May 2012. Two years and twelve appearances later, fellow Division 3 side IK Sturehov signed Fernandez in December 2013. He remained with them until mid-2016.

Division 3's IK Sätra resigned Fernandez in August 2016. He moved up a division in 2018, joining Valbo FF of Division 2. He terminated his contract on 25 January 2019, having appeared thirteen times for the club.

Career statistics
.

References

External links

1989 births
Living people
Place of birth missing (living people)
Swedish footballers
Association football midfielders
Allsvenskan players
Division 3 (Swedish football) players
Division 5 (Swedish football) players
Division 2 (Swedish football) players
Gefle IF players
Brynäs IF Fotboll players
IK Sturehov players
Valbo FF players